Chris Maitland (born 13 May 1964) is an English drummer.

Maitland was born in Cambridge, England.  After being the drummer for No-Man on their Autumn 1993 tour (and playing on two tracks on their Flowermouth album), Maitland was asked by the band's Steven Wilson to join his other main project, the progressive rock band Porcupine Tree. He remained the band's drummer until February 2002, when he was dismissed and replaced by Gavin Harrison. He played on the debut album by Blackfield in 2003, sharing drumming duties with Gavin Harrison. Harrison has described Maitland as a great drummer.

Between  2004 and 2005, Maitland was a member of the progressive rock supergroup Kino. Throughout his career, Maitland has been involved with many West End musicals, and from 2005 onwards, he has been playing drums on the Mamma Mia!  International Tour.
Aside from these links listing professional drumming engagements, having trained at the Mackenzie School of Speech & Drama and taken LAMDA examinations regularly since the age of eight, between 1985 and 1993 Chris became involved in theatre at Cambridge as an actor. Also during this period he built up a practice of private percussion pupils and from 1989 took on various posts as a professional drum-kit teacher.
As an actor, he has played a wide variety of roles, including Shakespearean roles.

In February 2009, it was announced that Maitland would play drums on Arjen Anthony Lucassen's latest project, Guilt Machine.

On 17 April 2011 in Zoetermeer, The Netherlands, Maitland was supposed to reunite on stage with former fellow Porcupine Tree's bass player Colin Edwin and no-man's singer Tim Bowness as part of the Memories of Machines project (a collaboration between Bowness and Giancarlo Erra of Nosound). However, the concert was eventually called off.

In 2013 he joined as guest drummer with band Nosound for their studio album Afterthoughts.

Discography

References

External links
Official webpage
Official Porcupine Tree website

English rock drummers
Progressive rock drummers
British male drummers
1964 births
Living people
People from Cambridge
Musicians from Cambridgeshire
Porcupine Tree members
Blackfield members
Kino (British band) members